Saoi (plural Saoithe; literally "wise one"; historically the title of the head of a bardic school) is the highest honour bestowed by Aosdána, a state-supported association of Irish creative artists. The title is awarded, for life, to an existing Aosdána member. There are at most seven living Saoithe at any time; a limit increased from five in 2007–08. At the conferring ceremony, a torc (a twist/spiral of gold, worn around the neck) is presented to the Saoi, typically by the President of Ireland.

Nominating process
A committee of ten members of Aosdána referred to as the Toscaireacht  monitor and manage the nominating process to confirm adherence to the established rules. Fifteen members of the Aosdána must nominate a candidate of merit and distinction. An election by secret ballot  then occurs with all members. Approval is determined by at least 50% + 1 of the membership voting approval. 

Only one nomination per vacancy may be processed through an election at a time. If multiple candidate submissions are received, they go through the election process one at a time until a successful approval is declared. Subsequent nominees are held until there is a future vacancy.

List

Notes

References

External links
Official Aosdána Website